The Wife He Bought is a 1918 American silent drama film directed by Harry Solter and starring Carmel Myers and Kenneth Harlan. This film was based on the short story One Clear Call by Larry Evans. It was produced and released by Bluebird Photoplays, a division of Universal Film Manufacturing Company.

Cast
Carmel Myers as Janice Benson
Kenneth Harlan as Steele Valiant
Howard Crampton as Hutch Valiant
Sydney Deane as James Brieson
Allan Sears

Preservation
The Wife He Bought is a lost film.

References

External links

Lobby posters: #1 and #2

1918 films
American silent feature films
Lost American films
Films based on short fiction
Universal Pictures films
Films directed by Harry Solter
American black-and-white films
Silent American drama films
1918 drama films
1918 lost films
Lost drama films
1910s American films
1910s English-language films